Ears Ring (EP) is a 2002 EP by the indie rock band Rainer Maria.

Track listing
All tracks composed by Rainer Maria.

"Ears Ring" – 3:44
"Alchemy" – 2:16
"Automatic" – 3:32

Personnel
Caithlin De Marrais  – bass, vocals
Kyle Fischer –  guitar, vocals
William Kuehn – drums

Rainer Maria albums
2002 EPs